Cândido is a Portuguese masculine given name, equivalent of Spanish Cándido

 Cândido de Oliveira (1896–1958), Portuguese football player
 Cândido Firmino de Mello-Leitão (1886-1948), Brazilian zoologist
 Cândido José de Araújo Viana (1793-1875), Brazilian writer
 Cândido Rondon (1865-1958), Brazilian military officer
 José Cândido Carvalho (1914-1989), Brazilian writer
 José Cândido da Silveira Avelar (1843-1905), Azorean historian

See also
 Candido
 Cándido